Nikolai Georgievich Puchkov (30 January 1930 – 8 August 2005) was a Russian ice hockey goaltender. He was part of the Soviet teams that won two Olympic and seven world championship medals between 1954 and 1960, including three gold medals. He was named the best goaltender of the 1959 World Championships and won the European title in 1954–56 and 1958–60. In 1954 he was inducted into the Russian and Soviet Hockey Hall of Fame.

Domestically Puchkov won nine Soviet titles with VVS Moscow and CSKA Moscow. In 1962 he moved to Saint Petersburg and after retiring next year coached SKA Leningrad until 1980. In the 1970s he also assisted Vsevolod Bobrov with the Soviet national team. In 1980–1990 he trained Izhorets Leningrad, and from 1990 to 2002 coached Swedish and Finnish clubs. In his last three years he worked with the junior team of SKA Leningrad until his sudden death on the way to a training session. In 2007 a goaltender school named after Puchkov has been opened in Saint Petersburg.

References

1930 births
2005 deaths
HC CSKA Moscow players
Ice hockey players at the 1956 Winter Olympics
Ice hockey players at the 1960 Winter Olympics
Medalists at the 1956 Winter Olympics
Medalists at the 1960 Winter Olympics
Olympic bronze medalists for the Soviet Union
Olympic gold medalists for the Soviet Union
Olympic ice hockey players of the Soviet Union
Olympic medalists in ice hockey
SKA Saint Petersburg players
Soviet ice hockey goaltenders
Ice hockey people from Moscow